Diego Armando Esqueda Osuna (born September 9, 1988, in Guadalajara, Jalisco, Mexico) is a former Mexican professional footballer who last played for Tampico Madero of Liga MX and former Kerala Blasters player.

External links

1988 births
Living people
Footballers from Guadalajara, Jalisco
Mexican footballers
Leones Negros UdeG footballers
C.D. Veracruz footballers
Atlético San Luis footballers
Lobos BUAP footballers
Tampico Madero F.C. footballers
Liga MX players
Association football midfielders
Kerala Blasters FC players